The 2024 United States attorney general elections will be held on November 5, 2024, to elect the attorneys general of ten U.S. states. The previous elections for this group of states took place in 2020, while Vermont's attorney general was last elected in 2022.

These elections will take place concurrently with the 2024 presidential election, elections to the Senate and House of Representatives, and various other state and local elections.

Race summary

Indiana

Attorney General Todd Rokita was elected in 2020 with 58.3% of the vote. He is running for re-election.

Missouri

Attorney General Andrew Bailey was appointed in 2023 after his predecessor, Eric Schmitt, resigned after being elected to the United States Senate. Bailey has stated that he plans to run for election to a full term. Republican former assistant U.S. Attorney Will Scharf is running for the seat.

Montana

Attorney General Austin Knudsen was election in 2020 with 58.5% of the vote. He is eligible to seek re-election , but has not stated whether he will do so.

North Carolina

Attorney General Josh Stein was re-elected in 2020 with 50.1% of the vote. He is retiring to run for governor.

Republican former state representative Tom Murry is running for the seat.

Oregon

Attorney General Ellen Rosenblum was re-elected in 2020 with 56% of the vote. She is eligible to seek re-election, but has not yet stated if she will do so.

Pennsylvania

Attorney General Josh Shapiro resigned after being elected governor. Deputy attorney general
Michelle Henry is filling the office as acting attorney general until she is confirmed by the state senate. She is not running for a full term.

Utah

Attorney General Sean Reyes was re-elected in 2020 with 60.6% of the vote. He is eligible to seek re-election, but has not yet stated if he will do so.

Vermont

Attorney General Charity Clark was elected in 2022 with 61.3% of the vote. She is eligible to seek re-election, but has not yet stated if she will do so.

Washington

Attorney General Bob Ferguson was re-elected in 2020 with 56.4% of the vote. He is eligible to seek re-election, but has not yet stated if he will do so.

West Virginia

Attorney General Patrick Morrisey was re-elected in 2020 with 63.8% of the vote. Morrisey has expressed interest in running for governor, and is expected to make a decision by April of 2023.

See also 
 2024 United States elections

Notes

References